The Templar Renegade Crusades is a combination of live performances, video clips, interviews, etc., by the Swedish power metal band, HammerFall. It was released by Nuclear Blast, first on VHS (May 21, 2002) followed by a DVD release (July 8, 2002). It includes video footage from recording sessions, live concerts, tour backstages and encounters with fans. The footage ranged from the recording sessions of Legacy of Kings to the gold album party which took place in November 2001.

Track listing

DVD
 Intro
 Hansen Studios
 The Templar World Crusade Europe
 The Templar World Crusade U.S.A.
 The Templar World Crusade Japan
 The Templar World Crusade South America
 Let The Hammer Fall
 I Believe
 Breaking The Law
 WireWorld Studios
 Renegade (video clip)
 Album Launch
 Always Will Be (video clip)
 Renegade World Crusade Europe
 Renegade World Crusade South America
 Wacken Open Air
 Heeding The Call (acoustic version)
 Gold Album Party
 A Legend Reborn (video clip)
 Outro

Bonus material
(Only available on special edition VHS and DVD)

CD

VIDEO

Personnel
Joacim Cans - lead and backing vocals
Oscar Dronjak - guitar and backing vocals
Stefan Elmgren - lead guitar
Magnus Rosén - bass guitar
Anders Johansson - drums
Patrik Räfling - drums on tracks 2-6

External links
Official HammerFall website
Album Information
Encyclopaedia Metallum
Nuclear Blast

References

HammerFall video albums
2002 video albums
2002 live albums
Live video albums
Nuclear Blast live albums
Nuclear Blast video albums